Ampaw, ampao or arroz inflado, usually anglicized as pop rice or puffed rice, is a Filipino sweet puffed rice cake. It is traditionally made with sun-dried leftover cooked white rice that is fried and coated with syrup.

Etymology
Ampáw means "puffed grain" in Philippine languages. Though it applies predominantly to the rice version, popcorn can also be referred to as ampáw (more accurately as ampáw na mais, "puffed corn"). In Cebuano slang, ampáw is also a euphemism roughly equivalent to the English idiom "[a person] full of hot air". Blust (2010-2020) posits it to be from Proto-Malayo-Polynesian *ampaw (“empty husk (of rice, etc.)”). Another Filipino word, ampaw (also spelled as angpao or ampao), referring to Chinese red envelopes should not be confused with this term, as they are close homonyms from Philippine Hokkien .

Description
Ampaw is made with cooked white rice (usually leftovers). It is dried in the sun for around four hours. They are then fried in hot oil to make them puff up. The oil is drained thoroughly after frying. The sugar glazing is cooked separately using muscovado sugar or molasses (or corn syrup),  salt, butter, and vinegar or calamansi juice. The glazing is poured unto the puffed rice and mixed until the grains are evenly coated. It is then allowed to cool and shaped into the desired form before it fully hardens. They are usually cut into square or rectangular blocks or molded into balls.

Traditional ampaw is white in color, but many modern variants are dyed in various colors to appeal more to children.

Variations
Ampaw can be easily modified with added ingredients. Examples include roasted peanuts, pinipig (toasted young rice), and chocolate. Ampaw can also be made with other types of rice, like brown rice or black rice.

References

See also
Pinipig
Binatog

Philippine desserts
Philippine rice dishes
Rice cakes